Diopsiulus madaraszi, is a species of millipede in the family Stemmiulidae. It is endemic to Sri Lanka.

References

Millipedes of Asia
Endemic fauna of Sri Lanka
Animals described in 1916